Larry "Crash" Crockett (October 23, 1926 in Cambridge City, Indiana – March 20, 1955 in Langhorne, Pennsylvania) was an American racecar driver. Crockett made 10 Championship Car starts all in the 1954 season with a best finish of 4th in the Pikes Peak International Hillclimb which counted for National Championship points at the time and finished in 11th in the 1954 points championship. Nicknamed "Crash" because of frequent racing mishaps, Crockett qualified for his first Indianapolis 500 in 1954. He finished ninth and earned Rookie-of-the-Year honors. He was killed in a racing accident at Langhorne Speedway the following spring.

Indy 500 results

Complete Formula One World Championship results
(key)

External links

1926 births
1955 deaths
Indianapolis 500 drivers
Indianapolis 500 Rookies of the Year
People from Cambridge City, Indiana
Racing drivers from Indiana
Racing drivers who died while racing
Sports deaths in Pennsylvania
AAA Championship Car drivers